Time Without Pity is a 1957 British film noir thriller film about a father trying to save his son from execution for murder.

The film was directed by expatriate American Joseph Losey after he was blacklisted in the U.S. during the (McCarthy / McCarthyism) era. Time Without Pity was Losey's second film in Britain and his first under his own name. The film stars Michael Redgrave, Ann Todd, Leo McKern, Paul Daneman, Peter Cushing, Alec McCowen and Renee Houston. It was the second film for which British cinematographer Freddie Francis was credited in that craft (the British credit is simply for "photography"). Joan Plowright appears briefly as a feisty chorus girl and Lois Maxwell, the first Miss Moneypenny in the James Bond films, also has a standout scene as a girl who can be bought.

The screenplay was written by fellow blacklisted writer Ben Barzman and adapted from the play Someone Waiting by Emlyn Williams.

Plot
David Graham, a recovering alcoholic, returns to England having only one day in which to save his son Alec from hanging for the murder of Alec's girlfriend, Jenny Cole. Graham has been a neglectful, absentee father who missed the entire trial while he was in a sanatorium in Canada. At first, Alec refuses to see Graham, and when they do meet, Alec is without any hope for reprieve and cannot show any affection for his father.

His sobriety in constant jeopardy, Graham believes that his son is innocent and begins a frantic last-minute effort to find the evidence that will save his son's life, if not redeem himself as a father. With the help of his son's steadfast solicitor, Graham desperately, and often ineffectively, investigates the circumstances surrounding the girl's murder, visiting first her furious sister and then the home of wealthy car magnate Robert Stanford, where the girlfriend was killed. Stanford and his family have provided the only real support that Alec has ever known.

Graham ricochets between potential allies, foes and new leads in order to learn who the real murderer could be, with suspects including Stanford's beautiful wife Honor, his even younger secretary Vickie Harker and his adopted son who's Alec's best friend, Brian, who allows Graham to see what his own misspent life looked like through his son's eyes.

With the Home Office on standby to receive any evidence proving Alec's innocence, Graham is forced to extreme measures to try to establish the real killer's guilt.

In a private room, Graham is permitted a final meeting with his son, with Honor there. Alec passionately kisses Honor, adding a new dimension. The conversation also alludes to Alec's relationship with Jenny. Honor leaves to allow father and son a final embrace, and more confessions are made.

Graham visits a pub with Stanford and gathers some more clues before getting very drunk.

Going to a theatre, he finds Stanford's alibi of spending the night with an actress was not actually true. He confronts Stanford at his race track where he is test-driving a Mercedes 300SL. Stanford explains that anyone can be bought and offers Graham shares in his company in exchange for silence. Still lacking evidence, he says that Stanford is threatening to kill him if he tells the truth. A struggle with a gun ensues and David deliberately has Stanford shoot him dead, saving Alec's life.

Cast

 Michael Redgrave as David Graham
 Ann Todd as Honor Stanford
 Leo McKern as Robert Stanford
 Paul Daneman as Brian Stanford
 Peter Cushing as Jeremy Clayton
 Alec McCowen as Alec Graham
 Renée Houston as Mrs. Harker
 Lois Maxwell as Vickie Harker
 Richard Wordsworth as Maxwell
 George Devine as Barnes
 Joan Plowright as Agnes Cole
 Ernest Clark as Undersecretary, Home Office 
 Peter Copley as Prison chaplain
 Hugh Moxey as Prison governor
 Dickie Henderson as Comedian
 John Chandos as First journalist
 Vernon Greeves as Second journalist
 Arnold Diamond as Third journalist
 Julian Somers as First warder
 Aubrey Richards as Prison gatekeeper

Critical reception
Derek Winnert called the film a "dark-hued, intense, intelligent and stylised 1957 British noir ... imaginatively and cleverly made by Losey, who pushes both its artistic symbolism and its heart-felt anti-capital punishment message to the limit."

References

External links
 
 
 

1950s crime thriller films
1957 films
British crime thriller films
British drama films
Films about capital punishment
British films based on plays
Films directed by Joseph Losey
1950s English-language films
1950s British films